Fellows of the Royal Society elected in 1796.

Fellows

 John Abernethy (1764–1831), surgeon.
 George Annesley, 2nd Earl of Mountnorris (1770–1844), MP 
 John Dalrymple (d. 1798), Admiral of the Blue 
 Sir George Smith Gibbes(1771–1851), physician 
 John Hellins (d. 1827), autodidact, schoolteacher, mathematician, astronomer and country parson.
 George Holme-Sumner (1760–1831) 
 William Howley (1766–1848), Archbishop of Canterbury
 William Langford, Eton schoolmaster 
 William Larkins (d. 1800), accountant, HEIC, Bengal 
 William Latham, antiquarian 
 William Lax (1761–1836), astronomer and mathematician 
 Thomas Osbert Mordaunt (1730–1809), Army officer and poet 
 Christopher Robert Pemberton (1765–1822), physician 
 Edward Riou, (1762–1801), Royal Navy officer 
 Samuel Rogers (1763–1855), poet 
 José Correia da Serra (1750–1823), Portuguese ambassador to USA, Finance Minister 
 Robert Smith (1747–1832), solicitor 
 Glocester Wilson (d. c.1852), Barrister at Law and Postmaster General of Jamaica

References

1796 in science
1796
1796 in Great Britain